Džoni Novak (born 4 September 1969) is a Slovenian former professional footballer who played as a midfielder. He represented his country at Euro 2000 and the 2002 World Cup.

Club career 
Born in Ljubljana, he started his professional career playing at Olimpija in 1988. He played there two seasons before signing for Serbian club FK Partizan. He played in Belgrade for a season and a half, appearing in 20 matches and scoring nine league goals for the club before leaving it for Fenerbahçe. After only a season in Turkey, he returned to Olimpija. Playing for Olimpija, Novak appeared in 63 league matches and scored ten goals. He also won the Slovenian championship twice with the club, in 1994 and 1995, and the Slovenian Cup in 1996. Later he moved to French club Le Havre. He played there for the next three seasons, appearing in 68 matches before leaving to join another French team, CS Sedan. He spent only one season with Sedan and left the club, making 11 appearances. He moved on to Germany and signed with SpVgg Unterhaching. He stayed there two seasons, making 37 appearances and scoring one goal. After that he played for six months for Greek side Olympiacos before retiring.

International career 

During his spell at Partizan, he earned four caps for Yugoslavia. Even after the independence of Slovenia, Novak was included by Yugoslavia in their squad for Euro 1992, along with Darko Milanič. However, the nation would be suspended due to the Yugoslav Wars. He was also capped 71 times and scored three goals for Slovenia. He was a participant at Euro 2000 and the 2002 World Cup.

International goals 
 Scores and results list Slovenia's goal tally first.

Honours 
Partizan
 Yugoslav Cup: 1991–92

Olimpija
 Slovenian Championship: 1993–94, 1994–95
 Slovenian Cup: 1995–96

Olympiacos
 Super League Greece: 2002–03

See also 

 Slovenian international players

References

External links
 Player profile at PrvaLiga 
 
 

1969 births
Living people
Footballers from Ljubljana
Slovenian footballers
Yugoslav footballers
FK Partizan players
Yugoslav First League players
Fenerbahçe S.K. footballers
Le Havre AC players
CS Sedan Ardennes players
Ligue 1 players
Slovenian PrvaLiga players
NK Olimpija Ljubljana (1945–2005) players
SpVgg Unterhaching players
Bundesliga players
2. Bundesliga players
Expatriate footballers in Germany
Expatriate footballers in France
Expatriate footballers in Greece
Expatriate footballers in Turkey
Slovenian expatriate footballers
Olympiacos F.C. players
Süper Lig players
Super League Greece players
Association football midfielders
Slovenian expatriate sportspeople in Turkey
Dual internationalists (football)
Slovenian expatriate sportspeople in Greece
Slovenian expatriate sportspeople in Germany
Slovenian expatriate sportspeople in France
Yugoslavia international footballers
Slovenia international footballers
UEFA Euro 2000 players
2002 FIFA World Cup players